The three public bodies of Bonaire, Sint Eustatius and Saba started issuing postal stamps after the dissolution of the Netherlands Antilles in 2010. The islands form a separate postage region under the name Caribisch Nederland.

The first stamp issued showed the maps of the three islands. Stamps of similar design were issued in the other newly formed postage regions of Sint Maarten and Curaçao.

The value of the previous stamps were denominated in Netherlands Antillean guilders, but was replaced by US-dollar denominated stamps in 2011 when the legal currency of the islands changed.  After June 2011, new stamps are being issued by  Post in US dollars. As of January 2014, Flamingo Communications N.V. has taken over postal services on the BES islands of the Dutch Caribbean.

Since 2014, stamps are inscribed with the names of the individual islands.

See also
Postage stamps and postal history of the Netherlands
Postage stamps and postal history of the Netherlands Antilles

References

External links 
 FXDC-Post

Post
Philately of the Netherlands